Guy Boyd may refer to:

Guy Boyd (sculptor) (1923–1988), Australian sculptor
Guy Boyd (actor) (born 1943), American character actor